Sir Henry Bedingfield (1632 – 6 February 1687) was an English lawyer and politician  who sat in the House of Commons in 1660 and from 1685 to 1686. He was briefly Chief Justice of the Common Pleas at the end of his life.

Early life and family
Henry Bedingfield was the son of John Bedingfield (1595–1680) of Halesworth, Suffolk and was baptised on 9 December 1632. He was the nephew of Sir Thomas Bedingfield.  He was educated at Norwich Grammar School and  admitted to Gonville and Caius College, Cambridge in 1650. He also entered Lincoln's Inn that year, and was called to the bar in 1657.  The following year he was made a freeman of Dunwich, enabling him to be elected to the Convention Parliament in 1660.  He did not seek re-election subsequently, preferring to concentrate on his legal practice.

Later career
In 1683, he presented an address from Dunwich, abhorring the Rye House Plot.  That November he became a bencher of Lincoln's Inn, a serjeant at law the following January, and a King's Serjeant the following November, when he was also knighted.  Following the succession of James II, he was elected a Tory MP for Aldeburgh.  In February 1686 he was appointed a Justice of Common Pleas and in April Chief Justice of the Common Pleas.

Private life
However, he died suddenly in the following February. He had married, c.1667, his cousin Mary, daughter of Robert Bedingfield, DD, rector of Newton, Cambridgeshire and had 2 daughters.

References

Further reading

 

1632 births
1687 deaths
People from Halesworth
People educated at Norwich School
Alumni of Gonville and Caius College, Cambridge
Members of Lincoln's Inn
Justices of the Common Pleas
Chief Justices of the Common Pleas
English lawyers
17th-century English lawyers
Serjeants-at-law (England)
English MPs 1660
English MPs 1685–1687
Knights Bachelor